Arago Glacier is a glacier flowing into Andvord Bay just northwest of Moser Glacier, on the west coast of Graham Land.

History
Arago Glacier was mapped by the Falkland Islands Dependencies Survey from air photos taken by Hunting Aerosurveys Ltd in 1956–57, and named by the United Kingdom Antarctic Place-Names Committee in 1960 for François Arago, the French geodesist who first demonstrated the application of photography to mapmaking in 1839.

See also
 List of glaciers in the Antarctic
 Glaciology

References
 

Glaciers of Danco Coast